

Men's senior team

Record

Managers of 2012

Goal scorers 

 Goals  on FIFA 'A' Match

Fixtures and results

Friendly matches

International Friendly

Non-International Friendly (against clubs) 

 1 Non FIFA 'A' international match

2014 FIFA World Cup Qualification

Third round

2012 Palestine International Cup 

 1 Non FIFA 'A' international match

2012 SCTV Cup

2012 AFF Suzuki Cup

Group stage

Men's under-23 team

Record

Managers of 2012
Just included match against country.

Goal scorers 

 Goals  on FIFA 'A' Match

Fixtures and results

Friendly matches

International Friendly

Non-International Friendly (against clubs)

2013 AFC U-22 Championship qualification

Group E

Men's under-21 team

Record

Managers of 2012
Just included match against country.

Goal scorers 

 Goals  on FIFA 'A' Match

Fixtures and results

Friendly matches

International Friendly

Non-International Friendly (against clubs)

2012 Hassanal Bolkiah Trophy

Group stage (group A)

Knockout stage

References 

2012
2011–12 in Indonesian football
Indonesia